Ian Robert Carmichael (born 17 December 1960 in Hull) is a former English cricketer who played first-class cricket for Leicestershire and South Australia in the mid-1980s. A left-arm fast-medium bowler he took 86 wickets in 33 first-class matches.

See also
 List of South Australian representative cricketers

References
 

1960 births
Living people
Cricketers from Kingston upon Hull
English cricketers
Leicestershire cricketers
South Australia cricketers
English cricketers of 1969 to 2000